Susan Silo (born July 27, 1942) is an American actress who is known for her work in voice-over roles.

Early life 
Susan Silo was born in New York City. Both her parents were actors.

Career 
Her acting career started in television on the episode "The Dick Clark Show" of The Jack Benny Show. Silo co-starred with Larry Blyden, Dawn Nickerson, and Diahn Williams in the NBC sitcom Harry's Girls, about a vaudeville troupe touring Europe.

Her first TV appearance was when she entered and won a contest over 350 people who auditioned across the US, at age 15, to sing (Mr. Wonderful) on The Jerry Lewis Show on November 5, 1957. She also made guest appearances in episodes of numerous TV series from the 1960s to the 1990s, including Alfred Hitchcock Presents, Hawaiian Eye, McHale's Navy, Route 66, Gunsmoke, Bonanza, Wagon Train, Have Gun Will Travel, The Many Loves of Dobie Gillis, Sea Hunt, Ripcord, Hazel, Combat!, Batman, The Man from U.N.C.L.E., The Love Boat, L.A. Law and The Wild Wild West. In 1964, Silo appeared in an episode of Jack Palance's The Greatest Show on Earth. She also played Rita Lane on Gunsmoke in 1969.

Susan Silo is a successful voice actress, and she teaches workshops in this field and lectures all over the country. She is also a successful singer, which she has brought to her work in cartoons. Silo began her voice-acting career as a talking cow in a series of Land O' Lakes Margarine commercials for over ten years. In addition, she has done animated cartoon voices for Hanna-Barbera, Marvel, Disney, Ruby-Spears, DIC, Film Roman, Murakami Wolf Swenson and many others.

Her famous roles are Wuya the Witch in Xiaolin Showdown, Sartana of the Dead in El Tigre: The Adventures of Manny Rivera, Dr Karbunkle in Biker Mice from Mars, White Queen on Pryde of the X-Men, multiple voices on What A Cartoon, Sue on Pac-Man and Tess on Zazoo U. She also played the roles of Mama Mousekewitz in Fievel's American Tails and Petaluma in The Smurfs.

She has also done voices for video games, such as Crash Tag Team Racing and X-Men (arcade game), where she reprised the White Queen. She later voiced Auntie Roon on The Life and Times of Juniper Lee and Flamestrike in Dragonlance: Dragons of Autumn Twilight in 2008.

In 2009, she guest-starred as the cat empress Neferkitty on The Garfield Show, episode "The Curse of the Cat People" and reprised the character in 2012, in the episode "Revenge of the Cat People". In 2014, Silo played Yin on Nickelodeon's The Legend of Korra.

Personal life 
Silo was married to actor Burr DeBenning, who died in 2003.

Filmography

Anime roles 
 Digimon Data Squad – Grandma Norstein (ep. 42)
 Zatch Bell! – Zofis (Milordo-Z)

Animated roles 
 2 Stupid Dogs – Additional voices
 Avatar: The Last Airbender – Fisherman's Wife (Ep.12)
 Attack of the Killer Tomatoes: The Animated Series – Fang
 Back at the Barnyard – Old Woman, Old Lady, Aunt Suki
 Biker Mice from Mars (2006) – Dr. Karbunkle, Native #2, Alien #1, additional voices
 Blaze and the Monster Machines – Granny Car 1, Granny Car 2, Grammy  (Episode: "Rocket Ski Rescue" and "Race Car Superstar")
 Captain Planet and the Planeteers – Additional voices
 CB Bears – Zelda the Ostrich
 ChalkZone – Stinky Witch, Ladybug (Episode: "Insect Aside")
 Channel Umptee-3 – Polly
 Curious George – Nettie Pisghetti, Marie Curie, Veterinarian, Queen, Elicee, Baby
 Daisy-Head Mayzie – Ms. Sneetcher
 Darkwing Duck – Neptunia
 Droopy, Master Detective – Additional voices
 El Tigre: The Adventures of Manny Rivera – Sartana of the Dead
 Fievel's American Tails – Mama Mousekewitz
 Foofur – Mrs. Escrow
 Garfield and Friends – Additional voices
 Inhumanoids – Sandra Shore
 James Bond Jr. – Miss Fortune, Phoebe Farragut
 Jakers! The Adventures of Piggley Winks – Miss Nanny
 Jumanji – Additional voices
 Kidd Video – She-Lion
 Kissyfur – Ralph Packrat
 Niko and the Sword of Light – Dolphin Queen, Shrimp Trooper
 Ozzy & Drix – Cryo
 Pac-Man – Sue
 Pryde of the X-Men – White Queen
 Richie Rich – Mrs. Regina Rich
 Ring Raiders – Siren
 Robot Chicken – Dorothy Zbornak, Louis' Sister, Girl (Ep. "Cracked China")
 Robotix – Compucore, Narra
 Super Dave: Daredevil for Hire – Additional Voices
 TaleSpin – Airplane Jane, Girl with Map, Mary Lamb
 Tarantula – Additional Voices (Ep. "Pajattery")
 The Addams Family – Mrs. Quaint (in "Dead and Breakfast")
 The Garfield Show – Neferkitty, Metalla
 The Legend of Korra – Yin
 The Legend of Prince Valiant – Barbarian's Mother
 The Life and Times of Juniper Lee – Auntie Roon, additional voices
 The Mask: The Animated Series – Selina Swint
 The Pink Panther – Additional voices
 The Rocketeer – Irma Philpot, Doris 
 The Smurfs – Petaluma
 The Tick – Jet Valkyrie, Jungle Janet
 The Mask: Animated Series – Additional Voices
 The Tom and Jerry Show – Auntie Louella
 The Twisted Adventures of Felix the Cat – Sausages, Mermaid on Bow, Additional voices
 The Wizard of Oz – Munchkin Mayor
 Tom and Jerry Kids – Additional voices
 Toxic Crusaders – Mrs. Junko
 Turbo FAST – Gypsy Moth
 Xiaolin Showdown – Wuya
 Where's Waldo – Additional voices
 W.I.T.C.H. – Miranda Beast, Slug (Season One)
 Zazoo U – Tess

Television roles 
 The Jerry Lewis Show November 5, 1957 as herself
 The Jack Benny Show – Girl (episode "The Dick Clark Show")
 The Many Loves of Dobie Gillis – JoAnn (episode "Dobie Goes Beatnik")
 Ripcord – Suzy Thomas (episode "Airborne")
 The Ann Sothern Show – April Fleming (episode "Always April")
 Sea Hunt (1961) – Leilani (episode "Cougar")
 Alfred Hitchcock Presents – Angela (episode "Coming Home")
 Miami Undercover – Vicki (episode "Mystery of Swamp")
 Route 66 – Marva (episode "And the Cat Jumped Over the Moon")
 The Tall Man – Amy Beckett (episode "Quarantine")
 Ensign O'Toole – Girl (episode "Operation: Model 'T'")
 Empire – MacCormack (episode "The Fire Dancer")
 Hawaiian Eye – Shannon Malloy (episode Shannon Malloy), Lita (episode "Tusitala")
 Hazel – Gabrielle (episode "Hazel and the Lovebirds")
 Sam Benedict – Barbara Eddy (episode "Read No Evil")
 Have Gun – Will Travel – Taymanee (episode "Two Plus One")
 Wagon Train – Betty Whitaker (episode "The Joe Muharich Story"), Susan (episode "The David Garner Story")
 The Lieutenant – Marie Eckles (episode "A Very Private Affair")
 Harry's Girls – Rusty (15 episodes)
 McHale's Navy – Babette (episode "Babette Go Home")
 The Greatest Show on Earth – Susan Silver (episode "Love the Giver")
 Burke's Law – Phoebe McPhee (episode "Who Killed Everybody ?")
 Combat! – Annice (episode "The Town That Went Away")
 Bonanza – Elena Miguel (episode "Woman of Fire")
 The Wild Wild West – Little Willow (episode "The Night of the Double-Edged Knife")
 The Man from U.N.C.L.E. – Anna Paola
 Dr. Kildare – Angie (3 episodes)
 Batman – Mousey – (episode 11 and 12 with The Riddler)
 The John Forsythe Show – Michelina (episode "Engagement, Italian Style")
 My Three Sons – Janine (episode "Our Boy in Washington")
 Occasional Wife – Vera Frick (3 episodes)
 Gunsmoke – Rita Lane (episode "The Long Night")
 Here Come the Brides – Ada Moon (episode "Next Week, East Lynne")
 The Love Boat – Yvonne Boulanger (episode "Parlez-Vous")
 Highway to Heaven – Mrs. Barney (episode "Catch a Falling Star")
 L.A. Law – Yvette (episode "The Unbearable Lightness of Boring")
 Night Stand with Dick Dietrick – Mom (episode "The Secret Crush Show")

Film roles 
 Babes in Toyland – Scat
 Beauty and the Beast (1992) – Clara, Evil Fairy
 Bebe's Kids – Ticketlady, Saleswoman, Rodney Rodent, Nuclear Mother, Additional voices
 Foodfight! – Additional voices
 Jetsons: The Movie – Gertie Furbelow
 Kiss Toledo Goodbye – Mrs. Beidekker
 Lilo & Stitch – Police Cruiser Computer, Additional voices
 Marriage: Year One – Shirley Lemberg
 McHale's Navy Joins the Air Force – Corporal "Smitty" Smith
 Once Upon a Forest – Russell's Mom
 The Ant Bully – Ant #4
 Once Upon a Brothers Grimm – Little Red Riding Hood
 Starchaser: The Legend of Orin – Incidental & Background Voices

Video game roles 
 Clive Barker's Jericho – Hanne Lichthammer
 Crash Tag Team Racing – Mature Woman, Old Woman
 Crash Twinsanity – Nina Cortex, Madame Amberley
 Diablo III – Monster Voices
 Dead Rising – Lindsay Harris
 Final Fantasy Type-0 HD – Cadetamaster (English version)
 Final Fantasy VII Remake – Mireille (English version)
 Freddy Pharkas: Frontier Pharmacist – Helen Back, Madame Ovaree
 Gabriel Knight: Sins of the Fathers – Cazaunoux
 Gabriel Knight 3: Blood of the Sacred, Blood of the Damned – Madam Girard
 Giants: Citizen Kabuto – Queen Sappho
 God of War II – Clotho
 Guild Wars – Glint, Justiciar Taran
 Jericho – Hanne Lichthammer
 The Last of Us – Additional voices
 Mad Max – Additional voices
 Quest for Glory IV: Shadows of Darkness – Baba Yaga, Fenris, Olga Stovich, Tatiana the Queen of the Faery Folk
 The Saboteur – Additional voices
 Sacrifice – Seerix
 Tales from the Borderlands – Vallory
 Tales of Symphonia – Additional voices
 Undead Knights – Narrator
 X-Men – White Queen

References

External links 
 
 

Living people
Actresses from New York City
American television actresses
American video game actresses
American voice actresses
20th-century American actresses
21st-century American actresses
1942 births